Cílio André de Souza (born 15 April 1976) is a Brazilian former footballer who played as a centre forward.

Club career
Born in Goiânia, Goiás, Cílio spent most of his 21-year senior career in the Portuguese lower leagues and the China League One with Nanjing Yoyo FC. With S.C. Beira-Mar, which he represented in four different levels, he amassed Primeira Liga totals of 25 matches and one goal over one and a half seasons.

On 25 November 2002, Cílio scored the only goal to help Gondomar S.C. defeat hosts S.L. Benfica in the fourth round of the Taça de Portugal.

References

External links

1976 births
Living people
Sportspeople from Goiânia
Brazilian footballers
Association football forwards
Campeonato Brasileiro Série A players
Atlético Clube Goianiense players
Guarani FC players
América Futebol Clube (MG) players
Erovnuli Liga players
FC Dinamo Tbilisi players
Primeira Liga players
Liga Portugal 2 players
Segunda Divisão players
S.C. Beira-Mar players
Rio Ave F.C. players
Gondomar S.C. players
Amora F.C. players
F.C. Barreirense players
Imortal D.C. players
CD Operário players
G.D. Gafanha players
Malaysia Super League players
Terengganu FC players
China League One players
Nanjing Yoyo players
Shanghai Port F.C. players
Brazilian expatriate footballers
Expatriate footballers in Georgia (country)
Expatriate footballers in Portugal
Expatriate footballers in Malaysia
Expatriate footballers in China
Brazilian expatriate sportspeople in Georgia (country)
Brazilian expatriate sportspeople in Portugal
Brazilian expatriate sportspeople in Malaysia
Brazilian expatriate sportspeople in China